The Twenty-Fourth Legislature of the Territory of Hawaii was a session of the Hawaii Territorial Legislature.  The session convened in Honolulu, Hawaii, and ran from February 19 until May 3, 1947.

Legislative session
The session ran from February 19 until May 3, 1947. It passed 248 bills into law. The Department of the Interior provided $47,200 for legislative expenses, including compensation and mileage of members. This Legislature amended the territory's child labor law during this session by raising the certification age for minors employed in the agriculture industry from 16 to 18 years.  The minimum employment age of minors was also raised from 12 to 14 years.

Senators

House of Representatives

References

Notes

Hawaii legislative sessions